"I Could Never Take the Place of Your Man" is a song written and recorded by American musician Prince. It was released as the final single from his ninth studio album Sign o' the Times (1987), becoming the third top-ten hit off the album. It has since been covered by numerous artists.

Content
The song is an upbeat pop number featuring a combination of live drumming with two drum machine patterns. Also featured are two guitar solos, one wild and energetic and one more bluesy and subdued in the full album cut. The song consists of two verses and two choruses, followed by a lengthy instrumental coda. The lyrics paint the image of a woman seeking a man to replace the one who left, while Prince refuses, saying that she would not be satisfied with a one-night stand. The music and accompanying music video pushed this song to the top 10 in the US. The video was taken from the Sign “☮” the Times film, and is a live take of the song and included the horn section of Eric Leeds and Atlanta Bliss.

Cash Box called it an "exceptional tune [that] is skillfully produced and performed."

The live version of "I Could Never Take the Place of Your Man" from the video and the Sign “☮” the Times film includes a horn solo in the song's coda. The solo lifts a part of the "Camille" and Black Album track, "Rock Hard in a Funky Place".

B-side
The single was backed with "Hot Thing", also from Sign “☮” the Times. The 12-inch single includes the full album version of "I Could Never Take the Place of Your Man", as well as several remixes of "Hot Thing".  One of these was included on the Ultimate compilation album in 2006. "Hot Thing" received enough airplay by DJs to chart on its own, reaching No. 63.

Track listing

7": Paisley Park / 7-28288 (US)
 "I Could Never Take the Place of Your Man" (fade) – 3:39
 "Hot Thing" (edit) – 3:40

12": Paisley Park / 0-20728 (UK)
 "I Could Never Take the Place of Your Man" – 6:31
 "Hot Thing" (edit) – 3:40
 "Hot Thing" (Extended Remix) – 8:32
 "Hot Thing" (Dub Version) – 6:53

12": Warner Bros / W8288T (UK) 
 "I Could Never Take the Place of Your Man" – 6:31
 "Hot Thing" (edit) – 3:40
 "Hot Thing" (Extended Remix) – 8:32

*also released as a picture disc (W8288TP)

Personnel 

 Prince – lead vocals and various instruments

Charts

Jordan Knight version

Jordan Knight, of New Kids on the Block, recorded a cover of the song as a ballad for his 1999 self-titled solo debut. The video debuted on TRL on July 27, 1999 at number 10. It features background vocals by Knight & Robin Thicke.

Track listing
US single
 "I Could Never Take the Place of Your Man" (Soul Solution Radio Edit) – 4:03
 "I Could Never Take the Place of Your Man" (LP version) – 4:04

US 12" vinyl
A1 "I Could Never Take the Place of Your Man" (Soul Solution Ext. Vox) – 10:31
A2 "I Could Never Take the Place of Your Man" (Soul Solution Radio Edit) – 4:03
B1 "I Could Never Take the Place of Your Man" (CZR's Funk Parlor Remix) – 8:13
B2 "I Could Never Take the Place of Your Man" (Soul Solution Dub) – 7:48

UK Maxi-CD
 "I Could Never Take the Place of Your Man" (LP version) – 4:06
 "I Could Never Take the Place of Your Man" (Uptempo Remix Radio Edit) – 3:54
 "I Could Never Take the Place of Your Man" (Soul Solution Radio Mix) – 4:09
 "Give It to You" (Club Remix) – 5:32
 "I Could Never Take the Place of Your Man" (CD-ROM video) – 4:09

Other cover versions
 The Goo Goo Dolls included a cover of "I Could Never Take the Place of Your Man" (shortened to "Never Take the Place of Your Man") on their 1990 album Hold Me Up.  The vocals for this version are sung by Lance Diamond who performed in their hometown of Buffalo, New York.
 Flesh for Lulu released a live cover on their 1990 album Final Vinyl (and Live Flesh).
 Dutch band The Essence released an uncharacteristic cover version as a B-side on their 1991 single "Out of Grace" from the album Nothing Lasts Forever.
 German singer/songwriter Michy Reincke released a German-language version of "I Could Never Take the Place of Your Man" on his second solo CD RinTinTin in late Summer 1992, translated and reworked as "Ich bin nicht Dein Mann". In 2010 he released an acoustic version of "Ich bin nicht Dein Mann" on his CD Palais Salam.
 Danish punk band Gob Squad produced a cover for the 2004 compilation Punk Chartbusters, Volume 5.
 Sigue Sigue Sputnik covered it on their 2007 EP Ray of Light.
 After performing the song live on tour, Eels recorded a cover for their 2008 album Useless Trinkets. The album also features a cover of "If I Was Your Girlfriend", another song from Prince's Sign “☮” the Times album. The video for this version is on the DVD Eels with Strings: Live at Town Hall, but without the audio. Authorization for use of the song was not received and the audio was replaced by an 'emergency commentary' explaining the situation in a veiled, but humorous manner by Eels leader E and guitarist The Chet.
 Wellington International Ukulele Orchestra included a cover on their 2009 EP The Dreaming.
 Seattle band Fruit Bats reference the track in their ballad "Singing Joy to the World" from the 2010 release The Ruminant Band.
 My Morning Jacket performed a cover of "I Could Never Take the Place of Your Man" during their set at the 2005 Bonnaroo Music Festival. They covered the song again in May 2016 at Iroquois Amphitheater in Louisville as a tribute to Prince after his death a few weeks prior.
 Paul Rocker produced and sang a cover for his 2014 album Identity Crisis, guest-starring Alex Vincent from the Alex Vincent Band on guitar.
 Aaron Freeman (aka Gene Ween) has performed this track live with Freeman in 2014.
 Minneapolis rock band the Replacements covered the song as documented in an unauthorized compilation "Essential Mats: Obscurities, Live Tracks, & Album Cuts."
 Country music singer Christian Kane has also performed a cover of this song.

References

1979 songs
1987 singles
1999 singles
Prince (musician) songs
Jordan Knight songs
Songs written by Prince (musician)
Song recordings produced by Prince (musician)
Music videos directed by Prince (musician)
Eels (band) songs
Song recordings produced by Jimmy Jam and Terry Lewis
Interscope Records singles
Paisley Park Records singles
Warner Records singles
American new wave songs
American power pop songs